Robin Briguet (born 11 May 1999) is a Swiss freestyle skier. He competed in the 2018 Winter Olympics.

References

1999 births
Living people
Freestyle skiers at the 2018 Winter Olympics
Freestyle skiers at the 2022 Winter Olympics
Swiss male freestyle skiers
Olympic freestyle skiers of Switzerland
21st-century Swiss people